Karabashevo (Qarabaş) is a rural locality (a selo) and the administrative centre of Karabashevsky Selsoviet, Ilishevsky District, Bashkortostan, Russia. The population was 613 as of 2010. There are 7 streets.

Geography 
Karabashevo is located 13 km southwest of Verkhneyarkeyevo (the district's administrative centre) by road. Ishteryakovo is the nearest rural locality.

References 

Rural localities in Ilishevsky District